Swan Island is located on the Willamette River about  downriver from downtown Portland, Oregon, United States. Although presently connected to the Willamette's east bank, it existed as a river island under natural conditions.

Swan Island and a nearby bar posed an obstacle to river traffic during the 19th and early 20th centuries, with vessels being restricted to a narrow channel on the island's east side. Proposals on how to improve navigation around the island included widening one of its channels or removing the island completely.

Swan Island was acquired by the Port of Portland in 1921. The Port undertook dredging to expand the channel on the island's west side, using some of the dredged material to connect the island to the Willamette's east bank. Swan Island was the site of the Swan Island Municipal Airport from 1927 until the early 1940s, and was the site of a Kaiser shipyard during the Second World War. The area is presently an industrial park.

History
The island was first noted as "Willow Island" by the United States Exploring Expedition in 1844. River traffic on the Willamette was impeded by a bar near the island, and annual dredging by the U.S. Army Corps of Engineers was required to maintain a navigable channel. A 1914 Oregonian article reported that the Portland Commission of Public Docks was unanimously in favor of removing the island, instead of developing it for commerce.

The purchase of Swan Island was proposed to Portland's city council in March 1920 as part of a $10,000,000 harbor development plan. Other features of this "Swan Island project" included the development of Mock's Bottom, a swampy area directly east of Swan Island, and the draining of Guild's Lake, located west of the island.

Swan Island Airport

The island was purchased by the Port of Portland in December 1921 at a cost of $120,577. The Port of Portland initially intended to develop Swan Island as a freight terminal site, but decided to construct an airport on the island to speed up the distribution of air mail to the city. Portland did not have an airport at the time, and air mail to the city was instead flown to Pearson Field in Vancouver, Washington, about  distant. A causeway connecting Swan Island to the Willamette's east bank was constructed in conjunction with the airport. Approximately 65 percent of the material dredged from the river—more than —was deposited in Guild's Lake, and much of the rest was used to connect Swan Island to the Willamette's east bank.

Swan Island Municipal Airport was dedicated in 1927. Passenger service ceased in 1940, after completion of the Portland–Columbia Airport, but limited operations continued at the Swan Island airport until 1942. The Port of Portland leased the Swan Island airport to the federal government in March 1942. Tenants of the Swan Island airport were ordered to leave the facilities in late February 1942 to make way for a U.S. Maritime Commission shipyard. At the time of the order, 150 privately owned aircraft were being stored at the airport.

Swan Island Shipyard

The Swan Island Shipyard was one of seven constructed by industrialist Henry J. Kaiser on the U.S. west coast—three in the Portland–Vancouver area and four in Richmond, California—to help meet the production demands of the U.S. Maritime Commission in World War II. Swan Island became the site of Kaiser's third Northwest shipyard (the others being the Oregon Shipbuilding Corporation in North Portland, and the Vancouver Shipyard in Vancouver, Washington). The completed Swan Island Shipyard had a total of 8 shipways and began production in July 1942. The shipyard was one of four in the U.S. specifically designed to produce T2 tankers, producing 153 by the end of the war.

Post-war development
Kaiser's dry dock and ship repair facilities were acquired by the Port of Portland in 1948. There had been some dispute about whether Swan Island should continue to be used as an industrial area or re-appropriated for aviation purposes. Oregon voters approved an $84 million bond to expand the shipyard in the late 1970s. The Port of Portland sold the facilities to shipbuilder Cascade General in 2000 at a cost of $30.8 million.

Industrial park

Swan Island is currently the location of a  industrial park managed by the Port of Portland. There is also industrial development in the adjacent Mock's Bottom area, a natural wetland that was filled in the 1960s. Shipbuilder Vigor Industrial is headquartered at Swan Island, where it operates a  shipyard with three dry docks. Swan Island is also the headquarters of Daimler Trucks North America. FedEx and UPS have packaging and distribution centers at the site. As of 2008, more than 10,000 people were employed at the industrial park.

Notes

Citations

Sources

External links

 

Geography of Portland, Oregon
History of Portland, Oregon
Islands of the Willamette River
Landforms of Multnomah County, Oregon
Overlook, Portland, Oregon
Port of Portland (Oregon)